Elena Lagutkina is an Uzbekistani former footballer who played as a midfielder. She has been a member of the Uzbekistan women's national team.

International career
Lagutkina capped for Uzbekistan at senior level during the 2010 AFC Women's Asian Cup qualification and the 2012 Summer Olympics – Women's Asian Qualifiers.

See also
List of Uzbekistan women's international footballers

References 

Living people
Uzbekistani women's footballers
Uzbekistan women's international footballers
Women's association football midfielders
Uzbekistani women's futsal players
Year of birth missing (living people)
21st-century Uzbekistani women